Ardeshiri may refer to:
 Ardeshiri-ye Olya
 Ardeshiri-ye Sofla
 Ardeshiri-ye Vosta